Pine Township is a township in Allegheny County, Pennsylvania, United States. The population was 14,691 at the 2020 census.

Pine Township was named for the abundance of pine trees.

Geography

Surrounding neighborhoods
Pine Township has nine borders.  Five are in Allegheny County, including Richland Township to the east, McCandless to the south, Franklin Park to the southwest, and Bradford Woods and Marshall Township to the west.  The remaining four borders are with Butler County neighborhoods to the north: Cranberry Township and Seven Fields to the northwest, Adams Township to the north and Valencia to the northeast.

Government and Politics

Board of Supervisors

  [2022-2024] Republicans-4 (White, Mackie, Avolio, Colombo), Democrats-1 (Donahue)

Presidential Voting

Demographics

As of the census of 2000, there were 7,683 people, 2,411 households, and 2,119 families residing in the township.  The population density was 457.7 people per square mile (176.7/km2).  There were 2,500 housing units at an average density of 148.9 per square mile (57.5/km2).  The racial makeup of the township was 97.16% White, 0.79% African American, 0.07% Native American, 1.12% Asian, 0.03% Pacific Islander, 0.16% from other races, and 0.68% from two or more races. Hispanic or Latino of any race were 0.74% of the population.

There were 2,411 households, out of which 51.6% had children under the age of 18 living with them, 82.2% were married couples living together, 4.0% had a female householder with no husband present, and 12.1% were non-families. 10.5% of all households were made up of individuals, and 4.4% had someone living alone who was 65 years of age or older.  The average household size was 3.14 and the average family size was 3.40.

In the township the population was spread out, with 34.5% under the age of 18, 3.3% from 18 to 24, 30.3% from 25 to 44, 22.3% from 45 to 64, and 9.6% who were 65 years of age or older.  The median age was 37 years. For every 100 females there were 96.1 males.  For every 100 females age 18 and over, there were 92.1 males.

The median income for a household in the township was $85,817, and the median income for a family was $93,201. Males had a median income of $75,418 versus $35,909 for females. The per capita income for the township was $35,202.  About 3.6% of families and 3.8% of the population were below the poverty line, including 3.9% of those under age 18 and 7.2% of those age 65 or over.

References

External links
Township website

Townships in Allegheny County, Pennsylvania